The 2017 Atlanta Braves season was the Braves' 52nd season in Atlanta and 147th overall. This was the Braves' first season at SunTrust Park, after playing the previous 20 seasons at Turner Field. The Braves began the season on April 3 at Citi Field against the New York Mets and finished the season on October 1 against the Miami Marlins at Marlins Park. On September 22, 2017, the Braves were eliminated from postseason play. They finished the season 72–90 to finish in third place in the National League East Division, 25 games behind the Washington Nationals. They failed to make the playoffs for the fourth consecutive season.

Offseason

October
The Braves made a number of changes during the offseason, starting with releasing Roger McDowell, who served as pitching coach for 11 seasons, on October 7, 2016. Four days later, Brian Snitker, who took over as interim manager for Fredi Gonzalez on May 17, 2016 and the team finished the season with a 59–65 record, including winning 20 of its last 30 games, was named as the new manager of the Atlanta Braves.

November
On November 10, the Braves signed a two–year, $8 million deal with veteran pitcher and 2012 National League Cy Young Award winner R. A. Dickey. The next day, they signed a one–year, $12.5 million deal with veteran pitcher Bartolo Colón. On November 28, the Braves acquired outfield prospect Alex Jackson and a player to be named at a later date in a trade with the Mariners. In exchange, the Braves sent pitcher Rob Whalen, who went 1–2 with a 6.57 ERA in five starts, and Max Povse to the Mariners.

December
The Braves continued their offseason realignment of their starting rotation in a December 1 trade acquisition of Jaime García, sending John Gant, who went 1–4 with a 5.76 ERA in 20 games (including seven starts), and two minor league prospects to the Cardinals. The next day, they signed one–year deals with catcher Anthony Recker and relief pitcher Paco Rodriguez, while releasing reliever Chris Withrow. On December 4, the team signed a one–year deal with pitching prospect Jacob Lindgren.

January
On January 11, the Braves traded Shae Simmons and Mallex Smith to the Mariners in exchange for two left-handed pitching prospects. On January 30, the Braves signed a one–year, $1.5 million contract with veteran catcher Kurt Suzuki.

February
On February 12, the Braves acquired Brandon Phillips in a trade that sent left-handed pitcher Andrew McKirahan and minor league right-hander Carlos Portuondo to the Reds.

Spring training
The Braves recorded a 9–22 win–loss record in pre-season spring training, excluding two tie games that did not count toward the standings. Their .290 winning percentage was the worst among MLB teams in pre-season.

Regular season

Season standings

National League East

National League Wild Card

Record vs. opponents

Season summary

April
Opening Day for the Braves on April 3 started with Julio Teherán pitching six scoreless innings, only surrendering four hits, but ended with the New York Mets scoring six runs in a five-walk seventh inning against the relievers of Ian Krol, Chaz Roe and Eric O'Flaherty and the Braves lost 6-0 to the Mets. In the second game of the series two nights later, Matt Kemp hit a go-ahead two-run double in the 12th inning to lift the Braves to a 3-1 victory over the Mets. In the final game of the series, Matt Kemp's two home runs couldn't lift the Braves past Travis d'Arnaud's two-run double and a two-run homer by Wilmer Flores in a 6-2 loss to the Mets.

The Braves made a late rally with three runs in the eighth, two off a hit single to center field by Brandon Phillips, but fell one run short in a 5-4 loss to the Pittsburgh Pirates on April 7. R. A. Dickey's debut with the Braves the following night, which included a two-run single to shallow right, was marred by two errors and surrendering six runs, three earned, in a 6-4 loss. In the final game of the series, the Braves pulled to a two-run lead, surrendered two unearned runs in the fourth inning, pulled ahead to a 4-2 lead with homers by Freddie Freeman in the fifth and seventh and allowed a third unearned run in the eighth. In the ninth, Jim Johnson loaded the bases for Francisco Cervelli, who hit a groundball to left side of infield and allowed Gregory Polanco to score the tying run. The Braves retook the lead with an RBI groundout by Tyler Flowers in the top of the 10th, but Starling Marte completed the sweep of the Braves with a two-run walk-off homer in the bottom of the inning to hand the Braves a 6-5 loss.

Bartolo Colón put the Braves in a six-run hole after three innings and only put up four runs in an 8-4 loss to the Miami Marlins on April 11. The next night, Ender Inciarte of the Braves and Giancarlo Stanton of the Marlins matched each other for home runs, with two, but it was Flowers who hit the winning go-ahead homer to snap the Braves five-game losing skid and defeat the Marlins 5-4.

Inciarte recorded the first hit and home run to highlight a 5-2 Braves victory over the San Diego Padres in the first official game at SunTrust Park on April 14. The next night, back-to-back homers from Phillips and Adonis García in the sixth led the Braves to a 4-2 victory over the Padres. In the third game of the series, the Braves opened the flood gates with a nine-run performance, including a solo homer from Inciarte, to defeat the Padres 9-2 and win their first series of the season. The final game of the series turned into a home run derby with two from Freeman, solo and two-run, a pinch-hit homer from Allen Córdoba and a two-run homer in the eighth inning by Austin Hedges, but it was Dansby Swanson's left field single in the ninth that scored the walk-off RBI to give the Braves a 5-4 victory over the Padres.

Entering the bottom of the ninth inning trailing three runs, Washington Nationals closer Blake Treinen loaded up the bases and allowed one run to score on a walk, but struck out Chase d'Arnaud to hand the Braves their first loss at SunTrust Park on April 18. A solo homer by Freeman was the highlight of the Braves's performance that included two grand slams surrendered to Bryce Harper and Ryan Zimmerman in a 14-4 loss in the second game of the series against the Nationals. In the final game of the series, Zimmerman hit a two-run homer and Stephen Strasburg struck out 10 to complete the sweep in a 3-2 Nationals victory over the Braves.

Freeman hit his seventh homer on the season in the first of a three-game road series on April 21, but that wasn't enough to overcome Jeremy Hellickson holding the Braves to three hits over seven innings in a 4-3 loss to the Philadelphia Phillies. Phillips's homer in the ninth tied the second game of the series and a throwing error by Tommy Joseph of the Phillies allowed Swanson to score an unearned run, but Johnson couldn't secure the game for the Braves, thanks to Swanson unable to get the ball out of his glove to secure a game-ending double play, and Maikel Franco hit a walk-off two-run single to deep right to hand the Braves their fifth straight loss. Kemp's solo home run in the seventh was the best the Braves could do against Aaron Altherr, César Hernández and Odubel Herrera hitting consecutive homers in the eighth and were swept by the Phillies in a 5-2 loss.

The Braves posted a five-run first inning, including a three-run double by Flowers, and Teherán allowed four hits and two runs in six and 1/3 innings pitched in an 8-2 win over the Mets on April 27, snapping a six-game losing skid. The final game of the two-game series the next night went back and forth for the first five innings, but Kurt Suzuki hit a three-run homer in the top of the fifth to lead the Braves to a 7-5 victory and sweep of the Mets.

The Braves rallied twice from four-run deficits, thanks to a three-run double in the third inning and Suzuki's pinch-hit single in the eighth, and hit the go-ahead two-run homer to center field in the ninth to clinch a 10-8 win over the Milwaukee Brewers on April 28. Kemp's three-homer performance highlighted an 11-run, 20-hit rout of the Brewers the following night and Jamie Garcia gave up only two runs on three hits over six innings pitched in an 11-3 win over the Brewers. The Braves carried a 2-1 lead into the sixth inning, but Swanson bobbled a grounder hit by Hernan Perez trying to throw to second and end the inning with two outs. This proved fatal to the Braves as Domingo Santana came up to bat and knocked in a three-run homer that ended the Braves's four-game win streak in a 4-3 loss.

May
Teherán started the Braves first game back home since April 20 by giving up a leadoff homer to Michael Conforto and gave up five runs in the fourth inning in a 7-5 loss to an injury-depleted New York Mets squad on May 1. The following night, Matt Harvey of the Mets surrendered six runs in five and a third innings pitched to three runs by Dickey. Jay Bruce's grand slam in the top of the ninth with two outs on the board pulled the Mets within two runs of the Braves, but Braves closer Johnson recorded the final out to give the Braves a 9-7 victory. The Braves could only muster five runs against an onslaught of 20 hits and 16 runs by the Mets in a 16-5 loss in the third game of the series.

The Braves couldn't muster a run in a 10-0 loss to the St. Louis Cardinals on May 5. Garcia's three-run homer kept the Braves alive, but couldn't overcome a two-run homer from Matt Carpenter, a solo shot from Matt Adams and being held to one hit through the first six innings in a 5-3 loss the following night. A four-run rally to send the game into extra innings on May 7 was rendered moot by Tommy Pham's two-run homer in the 14th in a 6-4 loss to the Cardinals.

Colón surrendered five runs in the first inning alone in an 8-3 loss to the Houston Astros on May 9. Freeman and García homered to give the Braves a 2-1 lead in the fourth inning on May 10, but Carlos Correa landed a double in left-field to bring in two runs and the Astros won 4-2.

Mike Foltynewicz surrendered just six hits and one run in six innings pitched, and the Braves ballooned a 2-1 lead with a six-run seventh inning to beat the Miami Marlins 8-3 on May 12 and snap a six-game losing skid. Teherán pitched six scoreless innings, allowing only three hits, and Nick Markakis and Swanson brought in runners with singles in the fourth inning to clinch a series win in a 3-1 victory the following night. The Marlins took the final game of the series with a three-run homer off the bat of Tyler Moore and beating the Braves 3-1.

Freeman's 13th homer of the season highlighted a 10-run barrage the Braves put up on the road in Toronto in a 10-6 victory over the Toronto Blue Jays on May 15. Swanson and Freeman homered in the seventh inning the next night to lift the Braves 9-5 over the Blue Jays in the second game of the series and last in Toronto. Back in Atlanta on May 17 for the third of four games against the Blue Jays, the Braves took advantage of a poor start by Joe Biagini with a six-run first inning, including a three-run homer by Kurt Suzuki, to take the series victory in an 8-4 game win. Marcus Stroman's fourth inning homer highlighted a nine-run shutout of the Braves in the last of a four-game interleague series.

With the score tied at four in the eighth inning on May 19, Enny Romero of the Nationals issued Phillips a one-out walk, who then stole second a few moments, gave up a right-field single to Markakis, allowing Phillips to score, and then surrendered a two-run homer to Suzuki to give the Braves a 7-4 victory. Flowers, Kemp and Rio Ruiz all homered to give the Braves a 5-2 victory the following day. Stephen Strasburg recorded 11 strikeouts and held the Braves to five hits in 7 and 2/3rd innings pitched in a 3-2 victory over the Braves in the final game of the series.

The Braves put the pressure from the start on Pittsburgh Pirates pitcher Gerrit Cole, earning five runs over 4 and 2/3rd's innings, including Phillips's 200th career homer, in a 5-2 victory on May 22. The Braves and Pirates swapped the lead three times after play resumed following a three and a half hour rain delay the following night, but Matt Adams lined a walk-off single to give the Braves a 6-5 victory. The Pirates rallied from a two-run deficit in the ninth inning and posted a seven-run rally in the 10th, thanks to three consecutive homers from David Freese, Jose Osuna and Jordy Mercer, to hand the Braves a 12-5 loss. Iván Nova held the Braves to two runs over 8 and 1/3rd innings pitched in a 9-4 loss to the Pirates to close out the series.

After Swanson was intentionally walked, putting two runners on base in the seventh inning, pitcher Garcia singled to left field and brought in Flowers, who was hit by a throw from Brandon Belt, and Swanson to score the first and only runs of the game in a 2-0 victory over the San Francisco Giants on May 26. Ty Blach held the Braves to a three-hit shutout heading into the eighth inning and faltered, allowing the Braves to score two runs, but it made no difference in the end as the Braves fell 6-3. Johnny Cueto allowed just one run and six hits over six innings pitched to beat the Braves 7-1 in the final of the three-game series on May 28.

Teherán surrendered three home runs on six hits over 6 and 1/3rd innings pitched, but was bailed out by a six-run third inning to give the Braves the victory over the Anaheim Angels on May 29. After Peterson bobbled a double-play that would've ended the seven-pitch scoreless third inning, Albert Pujols knocked a three-run homer to left-field and opened a nine-run inning that relegated the Braves to a 9-3 loss. Kemp's second inning homer put the Braves up 1-0 through the seventh inning, but the Angels tied the game on a Rio Ruiz throwing error and Eric Young Jr.'s go-ahead homer in the eighth closed out the three game series with a 2-1 defeat for the Braves.

June
Foltynewicz allowed just two hits and recorded 10 strikeouts over seven scoreless innings and Swanson put the Braves up early with a two-run homer in the third, but Johnson blew the save in the bottom of the ninth and Devin Mesoraco's walk-off homer in the 10th ended the game in a 3-2 win for the Cincinnati Reds on June 2. Adams recorded the first grand slam of his career with a four-run shot over the center field wall in the fifth inning, but the Reds responded with a five-run rally the following inning and the game went into extra innings. In the 12th, Adams launched a left-center field go-ahead homer to give the Braves a 6-5 victory. Inciarte had a career day with five hits and driving in five runs in an offensive shootout game that ended in a 13-8 victory for the Braves.

The Braves returned home on June 5 for the first of a three-game series against the Philadelphia Phillies, and opened the first game by surrendering nine unanswered runs, including a two-run homer to Odubel Herrera, in an 11-4 loss. García allowed a mere three runs on eight hits over 7 and 2/3rd innings pitched, his fourth consecutive game of allowing three or fewer runs, but the lack of run support relegated the Braves to a 3-1 loss. Swanson's three-run homer and Adams's two-run homer highlighted an offensive rout of the Phillies, and Foltynewicz complemented the rout with a four-hit, seven-inning performance to deliver the Braves a 14-1 victory. Dickey surrendered just three hits in seven innings to deliver the Braves a 3-1 victory over the Phillies in the last of the four-game series.

With the score tied at two, Swanson hit a double and scored on a walk-off single by Rio Ruiz to win 3-2 in the first of a four-game series against the New York Mets on June 9. The next day, Yoenis Céspedes's ninth inning grand slam hit to left-center field sealed a 6-1 victory for the Mets in the first game of the doubleheader. Steven Matz held the Braves to one run on five hits over seven innings pitched, Jay Bruce hit a three-run homer in the fifth and T. J. Rivera hit a two-run homer in the seventh to complete an 8-1 doubleheader sweep of the Braves. Seth Lugo gave up just one run off of six hits over seven innings pitched to clinch a 2-1 victory over the Braves in the final game of the series on June 11.

The Braves opened the first of three games in the nation's capital on June 12 with six runs and three homers in the first three innings, and blew multi-run leads twice, but Flowers put the Braves up with a three-run opposite-field go-ahead homer in the ninth and Johnson pitched the save to clinch an 11-10 victory over the Washington Nationals. Swanson recorded an RBI double in the fourth inning and Ruiz knocked out a two-run homer in the Braves' three-run sixth, taking a 5-3 lead, but Dickey failed to retire the five batters he faced in the bottom of the sixth – which included a two-run homer from Zimmerman, his second of the night – and fell 10-5 to the Nationals. Teherán surrendered only a two-run homer off six hits in seven innings pitched, while the Braves piled on the runs, including a homer from Suzuki, to deliver a 13-2 blowout over the Nationals.

Back home on June 16, Justin Bour's solo shot in the top of the fourth inning highlighted a five-run shutout of the Braves by the Miami Marlins. The following day, Tyler Moore's two-run shot over the left-field wall unleashed a seven-run barrage over the course of the fifth and sixth innings that put the Marlins up 7-3 over the Braves. Flowers led off the Braves comeback in the sixth with a two-run homer, Adams cut the deficit to one with an RBI double in the seventh to bring in Flowers and Phillips scored the tying run on a Markakis double in the ninth. With the score tied at seven in the 10th, Phillips drove in the winning run on a walk-off single to center and the Braves won 8-7. After the Braves carried a 4-2 lead out of the seventh inning and the Marlins tied the game on a two-run Marcell Ozuna homer in the eighth, Phillips knocked in a walk-off RBI single to give the Braves a 5-4 victory in the final game of the series.

The first of four games against the San Francisco Giants began as a pitching duel with Dickey giving up just three hits in seven innings pitched and Johnny Cueto surrendering just two runs on five hits through seven pitched, but the Giants bullpen collapsed in the final two innings – surrendering seven runs in the process – and the Braves took a 9-0 victory. After Swanson botched a double-play in the eighth inning, Austin Slater hooked the ball around the right field pole to record a three-run homer and the Giants scored two more runs – unearned – to beat the Braves 6-3. Hunter Pence tied the contest at three runs each with a solo shot in the ninth inning, but Kemp blasted a two-run walk-off homer in the 11th to hand the Braves a 5-3 victory. Lane Adams dispensed a three-hit homer in the fifth inning as part of an eight-run scoring barrage by the Braves, giving them a 12-6 cushion over the Giants that proved vital in the remaining four innings of a 12-11 victory.

In the first of three games against the Milwaukee Brewers on June 23, Phillips sent a shot over the left field wall in the first inning, Eric Sogard dropped an inning-ending double play feed – resulting in a run-scoring error – and the Braves halted their two-run rally in the eighth to claim a 5-4 victory. Dickey surrendered a run in the first inning, but halted the Brewers through seven innings pitched – and was aided by a two-run shot in the third by Phillips – to gives the Braves a 3-1 victory. Travis Shaw's two-run homer to right-field in the first inning sparked a seven-run shutout of the Braves in the final game of the series.

Sean Newcomb allowed only six hits and recorded eight strikeouts in six innings pitched in a 3-0 victory over the San Diego Padres on June 27. Manuel Margot sparked a trio of two-run rallies, giving the Padres a six-run cushion, to hold off a late rally by the Braves and win 7-4. Padres rookie pitcher 
Dinelson Lamet allowed only four hits through seven innings pitched as the Padres blanked the Braves 6-0.

Foltynewicz carried a no-hitter into the ninth inning, until it was broken up by a leadoff homer from Matt Olson, but Foltynewicz got the run support needed to deliver the Braves a 3-1 victory over the Oakland Athletics on June 30.

July
Swanson doubled to bring home Danny Santana in the ninth and give the Braves a 4-3 victory over the Athletics. Suzuki hit two homers, including a shot to left field in the 12th inning, to complete a three-game sweep of the Athletics on July 2.

Josh Reddick's grand slam in the ninth inning capped off a 16-4 rout of the Braves by the Houston Astros back in Atlanta on July 4. The Astros improved to a league-best record of 58-27 with a 10-4 season sweep of the Braves on July 5.

Freeman, back from a seven-week DL stint, hit two RBI doubles to put his career hit total over 1000, Suzuki homered in the sixth inning and Foltynewicz gave up just two runs off eight hits through six innings pitched to hand the Braves a 5-2 victory over the Nationals in the nation's capital on July 6. The following night, Dickey gave up just one run off three hits, and only surrendered his first hit of the game in the sixth inning, in seven innings pitched and Freeman drove in three runs to give the Braves a three-run lead in the ninth. But Johnson blew the three-run save opportunity in the ninth and Murphy hit a walk-off single in the 10th to hand the Braves a 5-4 loss. Teherán gave up no runs off four hits in seven innings pitched and the Braves pounced on Stephen Strasburg through three innings pitched to deliver a 13-run shutout of the Nationals. Rendon reached base four times in a 10-5 victory over the Braves in the last of a four-game series on July 9.

The Arizona Diamondbacks were gifted with a go-ahead run in the eighth on a throwing error, but when Freeman hit a clean base two-run single towards Gregor Blanco, who then proceeded to pick up and throw it to second, Phillips slipped rounding third, saw Blanco was throwing to second and raced home to score the game-winning run in a 4-3 victory on July 14. After Diamondbacks reliever Randall Delgado didn't get a full count call go his way, thus escaping the sixth inning with a 3-2 lead, pinch-hitter Lane Adams knocked in a bases-clearing, three-run go-ahead double that put the Braves up 5-3 and the Braves held on to win 8-5. García allowed just one run off four hits through seven innings pitched, Phillips doubled three times and Matt Adams and Kemp combined to add four runs with homers in the third inning to complete a 7-1 sweep of the Diamondbacks, putting the Braves at .500 on the season for the first time since April 17.

Wade Davis allowed the Braves to close to within a run of the Chicago Cubs in the ninth inning, but Johan Camargo hit a fly ball to left field that was caught to clinch a 4-3 loss for the Braves on July 17. John Lackey gave up one run, a leadoff second inning shot from Markakis, in a five-inning pitch performance, and was propped up by a four-run third inning that clinched a 5-1 victory for the Cubs. Mike Montgomery allowed one run off two hits through six innings and hit his first career home run in an 8-2 series sweep of the Braves by the Cubs.

Suzuki put the Braves up with a two-run homer in the first inning and Foltynewicz surrendered three runs off six hits over 6 1/3 innings pitched to end the Los Angeles Dodgers' 11-game win streak on July 20. In what wound up García's final start in a Braves uniform, he allowed three runs off seven hits over seven innings pitched and hit a fifth inning grand slam in support of a 12-3 victory over the Dodgers. Teherán's perfect road record on the season came to an end on July 22 when he surrendered three homers in a 6-2 loss. The Dodgers took a 3-1 lead in the fourth inning with a three-run hook to left by Austin Barnes, followed by an eighth inning solo shot from Cody Bellinger. Matt Adams erased the three-run deficit with a three-run homer in the ninth. The rally was for not, however, as Logan Forsythe hit a walk-off, bases-loaded single to beat the Braves 5-4.

Dickey exited the game after surrendering four runs without escaping the fourth inning, contributing to a 10-2 rout of the Braves by the Arizona Diamondbacks on July 24. Foltynewicz allowed two runs off five hits over six innings pitched, Suzuki broke a two-run tie in the seventh inning and added a leadoff homer in the eighth to highlight an 8-3 victory over the Diamondbacks. J. D. Martinez's two homers topped off a 10-3 rout of the Braves in the last of a three-game series on July 26.

Back east in Philadelphia on July 28, Teherán suffered a fifth-inning collapse, surrendering seven runs – including back to back solo homers to Aaron Altherr and Cameron Rupp, and a three-run shot to Tommy Joseph – as the Braves fell 10-3 to the league-worst Phillies. Newcomb exited the fifth inning after giving up one run off two hits in five innings pitched, but the 3-1 lead the Braves maintained collapsed through faulty relief pitching, resulting in Herrera's game-tying shot in the ninth and Ty Kelly's walk-off single in the 11th. Dickey allowed just six hits and no earned runs, only allowing one unearned run off a wild pitch, over seven innings pitched, but their inability to score with runners in scoring position (they went 1-for-8 on July 30) cost them when Freddy Galvis' walk-off single notched them a 2-1 loss. Herrera and Maikel Franco's homers completed a four-game sweep of the Braves on July 31.

August
Kenta Maeda surrendered only two hits in seven innings pitched and Cody Bellinger homered in the fourth inning to deal a 3-2 loss to the Braves back home in Atlanta on August 1. Flowers hit a two-run, pinch-hit homer in the eighth inning to snap both a six-game losing skid and the Dodgers' nine-game winning streak in a 5-3 victory. Wood allowed just a single run off seven hits through six innings pitched and Chris Taylor amassed three hits, including a two-run homer, to cap the three-game series with the Braves in a 7-4 victory.

Giancarlo Stanton's two homers midway through the first of a three-game series on August 4 put the Miami Marlins up 3-1, but sloppy fielding from the Marlins and a three-run shot in the sixth inning by Markakis sealed a 5-3 victory for the Braves. The next night, the Braves took advantage of the Marlins' depleted bullpen to score five runs, three off a left-center Freeman homer, in the seventh inning to put the 7-2 contest out of reach. Six strong innings from Jose Urena, allowing only a single run off three hits, and a three-run homer by Marcell Ozuna prevented the Braves from completing a three-game sweep of the Marlins in a 4-1 loss.

Herrera added to his hit streak against the Braves with a two-run shot to right field as the Braves fell 5-2 to the Philadelphia Phillies on August 8.

September 
The Braves took three games out of four in their home series with the Marlins, with all three wins coming by way of a walk-off.

Noteworthy: The Braves never held a winning record at any point during the 2017 regular season. Multiple times they had a .500 record, but would lose at least their next game to drop them back to a losing record.

Game log

|- style="background:#fbb;"
| 1 || April 3 || @ Mets || 0–6 || Robles (1–0) || Krol (0–1) || — || 44,384 || 0–1 || L1
|- style="background:#bfb;"
| 2 || April 5 || @ Mets || 3–1 (12) || Johnson (1–0) || Montero (0–1) || — || 28,113 || 1–1 || W1
|- style="background:#fbb;"
| 3 || April 6 || @ Mets || 2–6 || Harvey (1–0)|| García (0–1) || — || 23,100 || 1–2 || L1
|- style="background:#fbb;"
| 4 || April 7 || @ Pirates || 4–5 || Nova (1–0) || Foltynewicz (0–1) || Watson (1) || 36,484 || 1–3 || L2
|- style="background:#fbb;"
| 5 || April 8 || @ Pirates || 4–6 || Kuhl (1–0) || Dickey (0–1) || Watson (2) || 33,004 || 1–4 || L3
|- style="background:#fbb;"
| 6 || April 9 || @ Pirates || 5–6 (10) || Rivero (1–0) || Ramirez (0–1) || — || 22,713 || 1–5 || L4
|- style="background:#fbb;"
| 7 || April 11 || @ Marlins || 4–8 || Straily (1–1) || Colón (0–1) || — || 36,519 || 1–6 || L5
|- style="background:#bfb;"
| 8 || April 12 || @ Marlins || 5–4 || Vizcaíno (1–0) || Ramos (0–1) || Johnson (1) || 16,808 || 2–6 || W1
|- style="background:#bfb;"
| 9 || April 14 || Padres || 5–2 || Teherán (1–0) || Chacín (1–2) || Johnson (2) || 41,149 || 3–6 || W2
|- style="background:#bfb;"
| 10 || April 15 || Padres || 4–2 || Dickey (1–1) || Richard (1–2) || Johnson (3) || 41,149 || 4–6  || W3
|- style="background:#bfb;"
| 11 || April 16 || Padres ||9–2||Colón (1–1)||Cahill (0–2)|| — || 37,147 || 5–6 || W4
|- style="background:#bfb;"
| 12 || April 17 || Padres || 5–4 || Johnson (2–0) || Maurer (0–1)|| — ||24,516 || 6–6 || W5
|- style="background:#fbb;"
| 13 || April 18 || Nationals || 1–3 || Scherzer (2–1) || Foltynewicz (0–2) || Kelley (1) || 21,834 || 6–7 || L1
|- style="background:#fbb;"
| 14 || April 19 || Nationals || 4–14 || Ross (1–0) || Teherán (1–1) || — || 22,101 || 6–8 || L2
|- style="background:#fbb;"
| 15 || April 20 || Nationals || 2–3 || Strasburg (2–0) || Dickey (1–2) || Kelley (2) || 27,498 || 6–9 || L3
|- style=background:#fbb;"
| 16 || April 21 || @ Phillies || 3–4 || Hellickson (3–0) || Colón (1–2) || Neris (2) || 24,189 || 6–10 || L4
|- style=background:#fbb;"
| 17 || April 22 || @ Phillies || 3–4 (10) || Gómez (2–1) || Johnson (2–1) || — || 31,334 || 6–11 || L5
|- style=background:#fbb;"
| 18 || April 23 || @ Phillies || 2–5 || Rodriguez (1–0) || Vizcaíno (1–1) || — || 28,632 || 6–12 || L6
|-  style="text-align:center; background:#cccccc"
|  || April 25 || @ Mets || colspan=6| Postponed (rain); rescheduled for September 25 as part of a doubleheader ||
|- style=background:#bfb;"
| 19 || April 26 || @ Mets || 8–2 || Teherán (2–1) || Gsellman (0–2) || — ||  22,819 ||  7–12 || W1
|- style=background:#bfb;
| 20 || April 27 || @ Mets || 7–5 || Dickey (2–2) || Harvey (2–1) || — || 23,243 || 8–12 || W2
|- style=background:#bfb;
| 21 || April 28 || @ Brewers || 10–8 || Ramirez (1–1) || Feliz (0–3) || Johnson (4) || 26,453 || 9–12 || W3
|- style=background:#bfb;
| 22 || April 29 || @ Brewers || 11–3 || García (1–1) || Nelson (1–2) || — || 30,026 || 10–12 || W4
|- style=background:#fbb;
| 23 || April 30 || @ Brewers || 3–4 || Garza (1–0) || Foltynewicz (0–3) || Feliz (6) || 24,395 || 10–13 || L1
|-

|- style=background:#fbb;
| 24 || May 1 || Mets || 5–7 || Gsellman (1–2) || Teherán (2–2) || Familia (2) || 21,668 || 10–14 || L2
|- style=background:#bfb;
| 25 || May 2 || Mets || 9–7 || Dickey (3–2) || Harvey (2–2) || Johnson (5) || 21,359 || 11–14 || W1
|- style=background:#fbb;
| 26 || May 3 || Mets || 5–16 || deGrom (2–1) || Colón (1–3) || — || 22,656 || 11–15 || L1
|- style=background:#cccccc;
|  || May 4 || Mets || colspan=6| Postponed (rain); Rescheduled for June 10 as part of a doubleheader ||
|- style=background:#fbb
| 27 || May 5 || Cardinals || 0–10 || Lynn (4–1) || Foltynewicz (0–4) || — || 34,465 || 11–16 || L2
|- style=background:#fbb 
| 28 || May 6 || Cardinals || 3–5 || Leake (4–1) || Teherán (2–3) || Oh (7) || 40,706 || 11–17 || L3
|- style=background:#fbb
| 29 || May 7 || Cardinals || 4–6 (14) || Tuivailala (1–0) || Collmenter (0–1) || Siegrist (1) || 40,200 || 11–18 || L4
|- style=background:#fbb
| 30 || May 9|| @ Astros || 3–8 || Morton (4–2) || Colón (1–4) || — || 28,724|| 11–19 || L5
|- style=background:#fbb
| 31 || May 10 || @ Astros || 2–4 || Musgrove (2–3) || García (1–2) || Giles (9) || 23,676|| 11–20 || L6
|- style=background:#bfb
| 32 || May 12 || @ Marlins || 8–4 || Foltynewicz (1–4) || Urena (1–1)  || — || 20,052 || 12–20 || W1
|- style=background:#bfb
| 33 || May 13 || @ Marlins || 3–1 || Teherán (3–3) || Volquez (0–5)  || Johnson (6) || 26,692 || 13–20 || W2
|- style=background:#fbb
| 34 || May 14 || @ Marlins || 1–3 || Barraclough (1–0) || Dickey (3–3)  || Ramos (4) || 17,277 || 13–21 || L1
|- style=background:#bfb
| 35 || May 15 || @ Blue Jays || 10–6 || Colón (2–4) || Bolsinger (0–2)  || — || 29,766 || 14–21 || W1
|- style=background:#bfb
| 36 || May 16 || @ Blue Jays || 9–5 || Ramírez (2–1) || Barnes (0–1)  || — || 34,431 || 15–21 || W2
|- style=background:#bfb
| 37 || May 17 || Blue Jays || 8–4 || Foltynewicz (2–4) || Biagini (1–2) || — || 28,293 || 16–21 || W3
|- style=background:#fbb
| 38 || May 18 || Blue Jays || 0–9 || Stroman (4–2) || Teherán (3–4) || — || 25,419 || 16–22 || L1
|- style=background:#bfb
| 39 || May 19 || Nationals || 7–4 || Vizcaíno (2–1) ||  Romero (2–2) || Johnson (7) || 35,369 || 17–22 || W1
|- style=background:#bfb
| 40 || May 20 || Nationals || 5–2 || Krol (1–1) ||  Scherzer (4–3) || Johnson (8) || 37,347 || 18–22 || W2
|- style=background:#fbb
| 41 || May 21 || Nationals || 2–3 || Strasburg (5–1) || García (4–3) || Glover (3) || 32,895 || 18–23 || L1
|- style=background:#bfb
| 42 || May 22 || Pirates || 5–2 || Foltynewcz (3–4) || Cole (2–5) || Johnson (9) || 21,896 || 19–23 || W1
|- style=background:#bfb
| 43 || May 23 || Pirates || 6–5 || Jackson (1–0) || Watson (2–1) || — || 25,040 || 20–23 || W2
|- style=background:#fbb
| 44 || May 24 || Pirates || 5–12 (10) || Rivero (2–1) || Collmenter (0–2) || — || 25,981 || 20–24 || L1
|- style=background:#fbb
| 45 || May 25 || Pirates || 4–9 || Nova (5–3) || Colón (2–5) || — || 33,713 || 20–25 || L2
|- style=background:#bfb
| 46 || May 26 || @ Giants || 2–0 || García (2–3) || Cain (3–3) || Johnson (10) || 41,326 || 21–25 || W1
|- style=background:#fbb
| 47 || May 27 || @ Giants || 3–6 || Blach (3–2) || Foltynewicz (3–5) || Melancon (10) || 41,355 || 21–26 || L1
|- style=background:#fbb
| 48 || May 28 || @ Giants || 1–7 || Cueto (5–4) || Dickey (3–4) || — || 42,343 || 21–27 || L2
|- style=background:#bfb
| 49 || May 29 || @ Angels || 6–3 || Teherán (4–4) || Nolasco (2–5) || Johnson (11) || 37,891 || 22–27 || W1
|- style=background:#fbb
| 50 || May 30 || @ Angels || 3–9 || Bridwell (1–0) || Colón (2–6) || — || 32,028 || 22–28 || L1
|- style=background:#fbb
| 51 || May 31 || @ Angels || 1–2 || Parker (1–2) || Vizcaíno (2–2) || Norris (10) || 35,795 || 22–29 || L2
|-

|- style=background:#fbb
| 52 || June 2 || @ Reds || 2–3 (10) || Iglesias (2–0) || Ramírez (2–2) || — || 27,300 || 22–30 || L3
|- style=background:#bfb
| 53 || June 3 || @ Reds || 6–5 (12) || Johnson (3–1) || Wood (0–4) || — || 26,485 || 23–30 || W1
|- style=background:#bfb
| 54 || June 4 || @ Reds || 13–8 || Teherán (5–5) || Garrett (3–4) || — || 26,227 || 24–30 || W2
|- style=background:#fbb
| 55 || June 5 || Phillies || 4–11 || Pivetta (1–2) || Colón (2–7) || — || 20,942 || 24–31 || L1
|- style=background:#fbb
| 56 || June 6 || Phillies || 1–3 || Nola (3–3) || García (2–4) || Neshek (1) || 23,489 || 24–32 || L2
|- style=background:#bfb
| 57 || June 7 || Phillies || 14–1 || Foltynewicz (4–5) || Eickhoff (0–7) || — || 24,185 || 25–32 || W1
|- style=background:#bfb
| 58 || June 8 || Phillies || 3–1 || Dickey (4–4) || Lively (1–1) || Johnson (12) || 25,095 || 26–32 || W2
|- style=background:#bfb
| 59 || June 9 || Mets || 3–2 || Johnson (4–1) || Salas (0–2) || — || 36,791 || 27–32 || W3
|- style=background:#fbb
| 60 || June 10 (1) || Mets || 1–6 || Gsellman (5–3) || Newcomb (0–1) || Reed (10) || 27,684 || 27–33 || L1
|- style=background:#fbb
| 61 || June 10 (2) || Mets || 1–8 || Matz (1–0) || Wisler (0–1) || — || 40,174 || 27–34 || L2
|- style=background:#fbb
| 62 || June 11 || Mets || 1–2 || Lugo (1–0) || García (2–5) || Reed (11) || 30,638 || 27–35 || L3
|- style=background:#bfb
| 63 || June 12 || @ Nationals || 11–10 || Motte (1–0) || Albers (2–1) || Johnson (13) || 28,909 || 28–35 || W1
|- style=background:#fbb
| 64 || June 13 || @ Nationals || 5–10 || Gott (1–0) || Dickey (4–5) || — || 31,762 || 28–36 || L1
|- style=background:#bfb
| 65 || June 14 || @ Nationals || 13–2 || Teherán (6–4) || Roark (6–4) || — || 36,227 || 29–36 || W1
|- style=background:#fbb
| 66 || June 16 || Marlins || 0–5 || Straily (5–4) || Newcomb (0–2) || — || 38,123 || 29–37 || L1
|- style=background:#bfb
| 67 || June 17 || Marlins || 8–7 (10) || Vizcaino (3–2) || Ramos (1–3) || — || 38,661 || 30–37 || W1
|- style=background:#bfb
| 68 || June 18 || Marlins || 5–4 || Johnson (5–1) || Steckenrider (0–1) || — || 36,912 || 31–37 || W2
|- style=background:#bfb
| 69 || June 19 || Giants || 9–0 || Dickey (5–5) || Cueto (5–7) || — || 24,723 || 32–37 || W3
|- style=background:#fbb
| 70 || June 20 || Giants || 3–6 || Moore (3–7) || Teherán (6–5) || Melancon (11) || 23,823 || 32–38 || L1
|- style=background:#bfb
| 71 || June 21 || Giants || 5–3 (11) || Jackson (2–0) || Gearrin (1–2) || — || 25,771 || 33–38 || W1
|- style=background:#bfb
| 72 || June 22 || Giants || 12–11 || Hursh (1–0) || Cain (3-7) || Johnson (14) || 25,521 || 34–38 || W2
|- style=background:#bfb
| 73 || June 23 || Brewers || 5–4 || Foltynewicz (5–5) || Nelson (5–4) ||  Vizcaino (1) || 30,521 || 35–38 || W3
|- style=background:#bfb
| 74 || June 24 || Brewers || 3–1 || Dickey (6–5) || Garza (3–4) || Johnson (15) ||  38,463 || 36–38 || W4
|- style=background:#fbb
| 75 || June 25 || Brewers || 0–7 || Davies (8–4) || Teherán (6–6) || — || 31,634 || 36–39 || L1
|- style=background:#bfb
| 76 || June 27 || @ Padres || 3–0 || Newcomb (1–2) || Chacín (6–7) || Johnson (16) || 20,667 ||  37–39 || W1
|- style=background:#fbb
| 77 || June 28 || @ Padres || 4–7 || Perdomo (3–4) || Colón (2–8) || Maurer (15) || 19,312 || 37–40 || L1
|- style=background:#fbb
| 78 || June 29 || @ Padres || 0–6 || Lamet (2–2) || García (2–6) || — || 20,936 || 37–41 || L2
|- style=background:#bfb
| 79 || June 30 || @ Athletics || 3–1 || Foltynewicz (6–5) || Gray (3–4) || Johnson (17) || 19,286 || 38–41 || W1
|-

|- style=background:#bfb
| 80 || July 1 || @ Athletics || 4–3 || Freeman (1–0) || Casilla (1–3) || Johnson (18) || 22,230  || 39–41 || W2
|- style=background:#bfb
| 81 || July 2 || @ Athletics || 4–3 (11) || Johnson (6–1) || Axford (0–1) || Vizcaíno (2) || 18,438 || 40–41 || W3
|- style=background:#fbb
| 82 || July 4 || Astros || 4–16 || Peacock (6–1) || Newcomb (1–3) || — || 41,456 || 40–42 || L1
|- style=background:#fbb
| 83 || July 5 || Astros || 4–10 || Devenski (6–3) || García (2–7) || — || 37,278 || 40–43 || L2
|- style=background:#bfb
| 84 || July 6 || @ Nationals || 5–2 || Foltynewicz (7–5) || González (7–4) || Johnson (19) || 22,724  || 41–43 || W1
|- style=background:#fbb
| 85 || July 7 || @ Nationals || 4–5 (10) || Albers (5–1) || Krol (1–2) || — || 32,664 || 41–44 || L1
|- style=background:#bfb
| 86 || July 8 || @ Nationals || 13–0 || Teherán (7–6) || Strasburg (9–3) || — || 38,439 || 42–44 || W1
|- style=background:#fbb
| 87 || July 9 || @ Nationals || 5–10 || Grace (1–0) || Newcomb (1–4) || — || 35,030 || 42–45 || L1
|-style="text-align:center; background:#bbcaff;"
|colspan="10"|88th All-Star Game in Miami, Florida
|- style=background:#bfb
| 88 || July 14 || D-backs || 4–3 || Brothers (1–0) || Bradley (3–2) || Johnson (20) || 38,852 || 43–45 || W1
|- style=background:#bfb
| 89 || July 15 || D-backs || 8–5 || Krol (2–2) || Delgado (1–2) || Johnson (21) || 41,627  || 44–45 || W2
|- style=background:#bfb
| 90 || July 16 || D-backs || 7–1 || García (3–7) || Godley (3–4) || — || 36,637 || 45–45 || W3
|- style=background:#fbb
| 91 || July 17 || Cubs || 3–4 || Lester (6–6) || Teherán (7–7) || Davis (18) || 41,256 || 45–46 || L1
|- style=background:#fbb
| 92 || July 18 || Cubs || 1–5 || Lackey (6–9) || Newcomb (1–5) || — || 41,541 || 45–47 || L2
|- style=background:#fbb
| 93 || July 19 || Cubs || 2–8 || Montgomery (2–6) || Dickey (6–6) || — || 40,054 || 45–48 || L3
|- style=background:#bfb
| 94 || July 20 || @ Dodgers || 6–3 || Foltynewicz (8–5) || McCarthy (6–4) || Johnson (22) || 45.636 || 46–48 || W1
|- style=background:#bfb
| 95 || July 21 || @ Dodgers || 12–3 || García (4–7) || Wood (11–1) || — || 46,083 || 47–48 || W2
|- style=background:#fbb
| 96 || July 22 || @ Dodgers || 2–6 || Hill (7–4) || Teherán (7–8) || — || 47,497 || 47–49 || L1
|- style=background:#fbb
| 97 || July 23 || @ Dodgers || 4–5 ||Morrow (3–0)|| Johnson (6–2)  ||— ||44,701|| 47–50 || L2
|- style=background:#fbb
| 98 || July 24 || @ D-backs || 2–10 || Greinke (12–4) || Dickey (6–7) || — || 20,862 || 47–51 || L3
|- style=background:#bfb
| 99 || July 25 || @ D-backs || 8–3 || Foltynewicz (9–5) || Hoover (1–1) || — || 25,069 || 48–51 || W1
|- style=background:#fbb
| 100 || July 26 || @ D-backs || 3–10 || Corbin (8–9) || Blair (0–1) || — || 25,836 || 48–52 || L1
|- style=background:#fbb
| 101 || July 28 || @ Phillies || 3–10 || Thompson (1–0) || Teherán (7–9) || Benoit (2) || 17,177 || 48–53 || L2
|- style=background:#fbb
| 102 || July 29 || @ Phillies || 3–4 (11) || Neris (3–4) || Brothers (1–1) || — || 28,162 || 48–54 || L3
|- style=background:#fbb
| 103 || July 30 || @ Phillies || 1–2 || Neris (4–4) || Brothers (1–2) || — || 20,680 || 48–55 || L4
|- style=background:#fbb
| 104 || July 31 || @ Phillies || 6–7 || Pivetta (4–6) || Foltynewicz (9–6) || Neris (10) || 20,297  || 48–56 || L5
|-

|- style=background:#fbb
| 105 || August 1 || Dodgers || 2–3 || Maeda (10–4) || Sims (0–1) || Jansen (28) || 32,174 || 48–57 || L6
|- style=background:#bfb
| 106 || August 2 || Dodgers || 5–3 || Brothers (2–2)  || Báez (3–2)  || Vizcaíno (3) || 28,107 || 49–57 || W1
|- style=background:#fbb
| 107 || August 3 || Dodgers || 4–7 || Wood (13–1)   || Newcomb (1–6)  || — || 29,680 || 49–58 || L1
|- style=background:#bfb
| 108 || August 4 || Marlins || 5–3 || Dickey (7–7) || Conley (4–4) || Vizcaíno (4) || 35,914 || 50–58 || W1
|- style=background:#bfb
| 109 || August 5 || Marlins || 7–2 || Foltynewicz (10–6) || Straily (7–8) || Vizcaíno (5) || 40,731 || 51–58 || W2
|- style=background:#fbb
| 110 || August 6 || Marlins || 1–4 || Ureña (10–5) || Sims (0–2) || Ziegler (2) || 29,651 || 51–59 || L1
|- style=background:#fbb
| 111 || August 8 || Phillies || 2–5 || Eflin' (1–3) || Teherán (7–10) || Neris (12) || 25,783  || 51–60 || L2
|- style=background:#fbb
| 112 || August 9 || Phillies || 2–3 || Eickhoff (3–7) || Newcomb (1–7) || Neris (13) || 22,776 || 51–61 || L3
|- style=background:#fbb
| 113 || August 11 || @ Cardinals || 5–8 || Wainwright (12–5) || Foltynewicz (10–7) || Bowman (2) || 41,928 || 51–62 || L4
|- style=background:#fbb
| 114 || August 12 || @ Cardinals || 5–6 || Martinez (9–9) || Sims (0–3) || Rosenthal (11) || 46,360 || 51–63 || L5
|- style=background:#bfb
| 115 || August 13 || @ Cardinals || 6–3 || Dickey (8–7) || Wacha (9–5) || Vizcaíno (6) || 44,534 || 52–63 || W1
|- style=background:#fbb
| 116 || August 14 || @ Rockies || 0–3 || Dunn (5–1) || Brothers (2–3) || Holland (35) || 33,641 || 52–64 || L1
|- style=background:#bfb
| 117 || August 15 || @ Rockies || 4–3 || Freeman (2–0) || Neshek (3–3) || Vizcaíno (7) || 28,655 || 53–64 || W1
|- style=background:#fbb
| 118 || August 16 || @ Rockies || 2–17 || Gray (5–2) || Foltynewicz (10–8) || — || 30,695 || 53–65 || L1
|- style=background:#bfb
| 119 || August 17 || @ Rockies || 10–4 || Sims (1–3) || Hoffman (6–5) || — || 30,020 || 54–65 || W1
|- style=background:#fbb
| 120 || August 18 || Reds || 3–5 || Romano (3–5) || Dickey (8–8) || Iglesias (23) || 31,174 || 54–66 || L1
|- style=background:#fbb
| 121 || August 19 || Reds || 8–11 || Stephenson (1–4) || Teherán (7–11) || — || 39,317 || 54–67 || L2
|- style=background:#bfb
| 122 || August 20 || Reds || 8–1 || Newcomb (2–7) || Castillo (2–6) || — || 25,758 || 55–67 || W1
|- style=background:#fbb
| 123 || August 21 || Mariners || 5–6 || Albers (2–0) || Foltynewicz (10–9) || Diaz (28) || 21,284 || 55–68 || L1
|- style=background:#bfb
| 124 || August 22 || Mariners || 4–0 || Sims (2–3) || Gonzales (0–1) || — || 22,947 || 56–68 || W1
|- style=background:#fbb
| 125 || August 23 || Mariners || 6–9 || Phelps (4–5) || Johnson (6–3) || Diaz (29) || 23,890 || 56–69 || L1
|- style=background:#bfb
| 126 || August 25 || Rockies || 5–2 || Teherán (8–11) || Bettis (0–1) || Vizcaíno (8) || 33,577 || 57–69 || W1
|- style=background:#fbb
| 127 || August 26 || Rockies || 6–7 || Neshek (4–3) || Vizcaíno (3–3) || McGee (2) || 32,448 || 57–70 || L1
|- style=background:#fbb
| 128 || August 27 || Rockies || 0–3 || Gray (6–3) || Foltynewicz (10–10) || McGee　(3) || 28,154 || 57–71 || L2
|- style=background:#fbb
| 129 || August 28 || @ Phillies || 1–6 || Nola (10–9) || Sims (2–4) || — || 15,154 || 57–72 || L3
|- style=background:#bbb
|     || August 29 || @ Phillies || colspan=6| Postponed (rain); rescheduled for August 30 as part of a doubleheader ||
|- style=background:#bfb
| 130 || August 30 (1) || @ Phillies || 9–1 || Dickey (9–8) || Eickhoff (4–8) || —  ||  || 58–72 || W1
|- style=background:#bfb
| 131 || August 30 (2) || @ Phillies || 5–2 || Teherán (9–11) || Leiter Jr. (2–4) || Vizcaíno (9) || 15,706 || 59–72 || W2
|- style=background:#fbb
| 132 || August 31 || @ Cubs || 2–6 || Hendricks (6–4) || Newcomb (2–8) || — || 38,031 || 59–73 || L1
|-

|- style=background:#fbb
| 133 || September 1 || @ Cubs || 0–2 || Lackey (11–10) || Foltynewicz (10–11) || Davis (28) || 37,280 || 59–74 || L2
|- style=background:#fbb
| 134 || September 2 || @ Cubs || 12–14 || Lester (9–7) || Sims (2–5) || — || 41,329 || 59–75 || L3
|- style=background:#bfb
| 135 || September 3 || @ Cubs || 5–1 || Fried (1–0) || Montgomery (5–7) || — || 42,145 || 60–75 || W1
|- style=background:#fbb
| 136 || September 4 || Rangers || 2–8 || Cashner (9–9) || Dickey (9–9) || — || 23,474 || 60–76 || L1
|- style=background:#bbb
|     || September 5 || Rangers || colspan=6| Postponed (rain); rescheduled for September 6 as part of a doubleheader ||
|- style=background:#fbb
| 137 || September 6 (1) || Rangers || 8–12 || Bibens-Dirkx (5–2) || Gohara (0–1) || — || 19,971 || 60–77 || L2
|- style=background:#bfb
| 138 || September 6 (2)|| Rangers || 5–4 || Teherán (10–11) || Hamels (9–3) || Vizcaíno (10) || 20,364 || 61–77 || W1
|- style=background:#bfb
| 139 || September 7 || Marlins || 6–5 || Brothers (3–3) || Ziegler (1–4) || — || 23,561 || 62–77 || W2
|- style=background:#fbb
| 140 || September 8 || Marlins || 1–7 || Ureňa (13–6) || Foltynewicz (10–12) || — || 30,056 || 62–78 || L1
|- style=background:#bfb
| 141 || September 9 || Marlins || 6–5 || Vizcaíno (4–3) || Barraclough (5–2) || — || 34,403 || 63–78 || W1
|- style=background:#bfb
| 142 || September 10 || Marlins || 10–8 (11) || Vizcaíno (5–3) || Worley (2–5) || — || 34,974 || 64–78 || W2
|- style=background:#bfb
| 143 || September 12 || @ Nationals ||| 8–0 || Teherán (11–11) || González (14–7) || — || 22,769 || 65–78 || W3
|- style=background:#bfb
| 144 || September 13 || @ Nationals || 8–2 || Gohara (1–1) || Scherzer (14–6) || — || 24,850 || 66–78 || W4
|- style=background:#fbb
| 145 || September 14 || @ Nationals || 2–5 || Roark (13–9) || Foltynewicz (10–13) || Doolittle (21) || 25,192 || 66–79 || L1
|- style=background:#bfb
| 146 || September 15 || Mets || 3–2 || Newcomb (3–8) || Montero (5–10) || Vizcaíno (11) || 29,402 || 67–79 || W1
|- style=background:#fbb
| 147 || September 16 || Mets || 3–7 || deGrom (15–9) || Dickey (9–10) || — || 37,846 || 67–80 || L1
|- style=background:#fbb
| 148 || September 17 || Mets || 1–5 || Gsellman (7–7) || Teherán (11–12) || — || 32,785 || 67–81 || L2
|- style=background:#fbb
| 149 || September 19 || Nationals || 2–4 || Scherzer (15–6) || Gohara (1–2) || Doolittle (22) || 26,709 || 67–82 || L3
|- style=background:#fbb
| 150 || September 20 || Nationals || 3–7 || González (15–7) || Ramírez (2–3) || — || 25,054 || 67–83 || L4
|- style=background:#bfb
| 151 || September 21 || Nationals || 3–2 || Dickey (10–10) || Roark (13–10) || Vizcaíno (12) || 32,702 || 68–83 || W1
|- style=background:#bfb
| 152 || September 22 || Phillies || 7–2 || Newcomb (4–8) || Lively (3–7) || — || 33,702 || 69–83 || W2
|- style=background:#bfb
| 153 || September 23 || Phillies || 4–2 || Brothers (4–3) || García (2–5) || Vizcaíno (13) || 39,809 || 70–83 || W3
|- style=background:#fbb
| 154 || September 24 || Phillies || 0–2 || Pivetta (7–10) || Gohara (1–3) || Neris (24) || 33,183 || 70–84 || L1
|- style=background:#bfb
| 155 || September 25 (1) || @ Mets || 9–2 || Sims (3–5) || Flexen (3–5) || — ||  || 71–84 || W1
|- style=background:#fbb
| 156 || September 25 (2)|| @ Mets || 2–3 || Lugo (7–5) || Fried (1–1) || Familia (5) || 21,698 || 71–85 || L1
|- style=background:#fbb
| 157 || September 26 || @ Mets || 3–4 || Familia (2–2) || Minter (0–1) || — || 21,938 || 71–86 || L2
|- style=background:#fbb
| 158 || September 27 || @ Mets || 1–7 || Gsellman (8–7) || Newcomb (4–9) || — || 28,617 || 71–87 || L3
|- style=background:#fbb
| 159 || September 28 || @ Marlins || 1–7 || Peters (1–2) || Teherán (11–13) || — || 17,305 || 71–88 || L4
|- style=background:#fbb
| 160 || September 29 || @ Marlins || 5–6 || Conley (8–8) || Winker (0–1) || Ziegler (10) || 19,527 || 71–89 || L5
|- style=background:#fbb
| 161 || September 30 || @ Marlins || 2–10 || Despaigne (2–3) || Sims (3–6) || — || 25,264 || 71–90 || L6 
|- style=background:#bfb
| 162 || October 1 || @ Marlins || 8–5 || Winkler (1–1) || Tazawa (3–5) || Vizcaíno (14) || 25,222 || 72–90 || W1
|-

|-
| Legend:       = Win       = Loss       = PostponementBold = Braves team member

Roster

Statistics

Source:

Batting

Players in bold are on the active MLB roster as of the 2022 season.

Note: G = Games played; AB = At bats; R = Runs; H = Hits; 2B = Doubles; 3B = Triples; HR = Home runs; RBI = Runs batted in; AVG = Batting average; OBP = On-base percentage; SLG = Slugging percentage; SB = Stolen bases

Pitching

Players in bold are on the active MLB roster as of the 2022 season.Note: W = Wins; L = Losses; ERA = Earned run average; G = Games pitched; GS = Games started; SV = Saves; IP = Innings pitched; H = Hits allowed; R = Runs allowed; ER = Earned runs allowed; HR = Home runs allowed; BB = Walks allowed; K = StrikeoutsFarm system

References

External links
2017 Atlanta Braves season at Baseball Reference''

Atlanta Braves seasons
Atlanta Braves
Atlanta Braves